Digital Video Broadcasting – Satellite (DVB-S) is the original DVB standard for satellite television and dates from 1995, in its first release, while development lasted from 1993 to 1997. The first commercial applications were by Star TV in Asia and Galaxy in Australia, enabling digitally broadcast, satellite-delivered television to the public. DVB-S was the first DVB standard for satellite, defining the framing structure, channel coding and modulation for 11/12 GHz satellite services.

It is used via satellites serving every continent of the world. DVB-S is used in both multiple channel per carrier (MCPC) and single channel per carrier modes for broadcast network feeds as well as for direct-broadcast satellite services like Sky UK and Ireland via Astra in Europe, Dish Network and Globecast in the U.S. and Bell Satellite TV in Canada.

While the actual DVB-S standard only specifies physical link characteristics and framing, the overlaid transport stream delivered by DVB-S is mandated as MPEG-2, known as MPEG transport stream (MPEG-TS).

Some amateur television repeaters also use this mode in the 1.2 GHz amateur band.

References

DVB-S/S2 
https://www.etsi.org/technologies/dvb-s-s2

DVB specifications 
https://dvb.org/specifications/

ETSI EN 300 421 V1.1.2 (1997-08)
Digital Video Broadcasting (DVB); Framing structure, channel coding and modulation for 11/12 GHz satellite services
https://www.etsi.org/standards#page=1&search=EN%20300%20421&title=1&etsiNumber=1&content=0&version=0&onApproval=1&published=1&withdrawn=1&historical=1&isCurrent=1&superseded=1&startDate=1988-01-15&endDate=2023-02-13&harmonized=0&keyword=&TB=&stdType=&frequency=&mandate=&collection=&sort=1

External links

 ETSI DVB-S/S2
 DVB-S TR 101 198 V1.1.1 (09/97) Implementation of Binary Phase Shift Keying (BPSK) modulation in DVB satellite transmission systems
 DVB-S EN 300 421 V1.1.2 (08/97) Framing structure, channel coding and modulation for 11/12 GHz satellite services
 Irdeto history

Digital Video Broadcasting
Satellite broadcasting
Television transmission standards